BIM-018 is a synthetic cannabinoid that is the benzimidazole analog of JWH-018. It is presumed to be a potent agonist of the CB2 receptor and has been sold online as a designer drug.

Related benzimidazole derivatives have been reported to be highly selective agonists for the CB2 receptor.

See also 

 AM-2201
 AZD-1940
 AZ-11713908
 FUBIMINA
 MCHB-1
 THJ-018
 THJ-2201

References 

Benzimidazoles
Cannabinoids
Designer drugs